Bobby Edwards (born August 11, 1995) is a retired former American soccer goalkeeper.

Raised in Parsippany-Troy Hills, New Jersey, Edwards played prep soccer at St. Benedict's Preparatory School.

Career

College
Edwards began his college career at Saint Joseph's University, and subsequently spent time at Monmouth University and Mount St. Mary's University. He made a total of 62 appearances in his college career. Edwards played in the Player Development Summer League with the New York Red Bulls U-23 in 2016 and 2017 and with the SC United Bantams in 2018 and 2019.  Edwards was named to the Team of the Year for the USL2 2019 season.

Professional
In June 2019, Edwards signed his first professional contract with Portadown F.C. of the NIFL Premiership, where he would make 23 appearances at goalkeeper leading the team to a first place finish. Edwards was pivotal to The Ports’ title run, registering a 16W-3L-4D record and finishing with a sparkling 0.78 goals against average and 12 shutouts.While playing for Portadown FC Edwards went on trials with the Blackburn Rovers in the English Football Championship League as well as with Burnley FC in the English Premier League.

Edwards signed with Major League Soccer side FC Cincinnati on January 20, 2020 playing two games in goal, including the only game since joining the MLS that FC Cincinnati has been victorious over their arch rivals, the Columbus Crew. He was released by Cincinnati at the end of their 2020 season.

On February 12, 2021, Edwards signed with USL Championship side Indy Eleven. Following the 2021 season, Edwards re-signed with Indy ahead of the 2022 season.

On February 11, 2022, Edwards announced his retirement from playing professional soccer, citing personal reasons for his decision. Edwards took up a new role as Indy Eleven's assistant goalkeeper coach and Director of Goalkeeping for Indiana Fire Juniors' MLS NEXT Academy.

Personal
Through his friendship with the Cordrey Family of Cincinnati, Edwards has been an outspoken advocate of *Brain Aneurysm Awareness", "NRC Foundation" and "Donate Life" as a way of honoring the legacy of the life of young Nick Cordrey.

References

External links

Saint Joseph's Hawks bio
Mount St. Mary's Mountaineers bio
New York Red Bulls U-23's bio
SC United Bantams's bio

1995 births
American soccer players
Association football goalkeepers
Portadown F.C. players
FC Cincinnati players
Indy Eleven players
Living people
Major League Soccer players
Soccer players from New Jersey
People from Parsippany-Troy Hills, New Jersey
St. Benedict's Preparatory School alumni
Sportspeople from Morris County, New Jersey
Saint Joseph's Hawks men's soccer players
Monmouth Hawks men's soccer players
Mount St. Mary's Mountaineers men's soccer players
Expatriate association footballers in Northern Ireland
American expatriate soccer players